Would You Take Another Chance on Me? is an album by Jerry Lee Lewis that was released on Mercury Records in 1971.

Recording
Lewis's fourth Mercury album of 1971 includes his radical arrangement of the Kris Kristofferson classic "Me and Bobby McGee". Although producer Jerry Kennedy avoided releasing singles in the country market that featured Jerry Lee's trademark "boogie woogie" piano style, by late 1971 Lewis had amassed so many country hits that Kennedy began to alter his approach. As Colin Escott writes in the liner notes to the 2006 retrospective A Half Century of Hits, "Since the country breakthrough in 1968, Lewis's records had been spare, unornamented and unremittingly slow-paced. After three years Kennedy decided to break out of the artistic straitjacket. When Lewis arrived at Mercury's studio in August 1971 he was greeted by a 10-piece string section rehearsing a Kris Kristofferson song. Kennedy wanted to give the big-budget treatment to 'Me and Bobby McGee'. The song had been a country hit for Roger Miller and a pop hit for Janis Joplin, and so if Lewis was to do it, he would have to rethink it. And that's what he did. In losing Kristofferson's whimsicality, he created a new song." In addition to Kristofferson, Merle Haggard had been another writer Lewis kept returning to during his impressive run, this time recording the honky-tonk "drinkin' song" "Swinging Doors".

Would You Take Another Chance on Me? does betray a "countrypolitan" influence, containing more elaborate productions that were becoming more common on country radio largely due to the influence of Billy Sherrill, who was enjoying tremendous success at Epic Records producing Lewis's old Sun label-mate Charlie Rich and Tammy Wynette by employing strings and layered background vocalists to create a Phil Spector-like "wall of sound". As Lewis's behaviour became more erratic as the decade wore on, Kennedy would do his best to keep his artist relevant in the country charts by turning more towards this sweetened sound.

Reception
The album's title track became Lewis's second number one country hit of 1971, and "Me and Bobby McGee" would crack the top 40 on the pop charts, the first time he had done so since 1961. The album itself peaked at number three on the Billboard country albums chart. AllMusic states that the collection "is slowed by layers of backing vocals, gauzy accouterments that turn this into an album approximating romance..."

Track listing

Personnel
Jerry Lee Lewis - vocals, piano
Chip Young, Harold Bradley, Jerry Kennedy, Ray Edenton - guitar
Pete Drake - steel guitar
Kenny Lovelace - fiddle
Bob Moore - bass
Bill Strom - organ
Buddy Harman - drums
The Nashville Edition - vocal accompaniment; Cam Mullins - arrangements on "Would You Take Another Chance on Me", "Me and Bobby McGee" and "For the Good Times"
The Nashville Sounds - vocal accompaniment

External links

1971 albums
Jerry Lee Lewis albums
Albums produced by Jerry Kennedy
Mercury Records albums